100 is a Big Finish Productions audio drama based on the long-running British science fiction television series Doctor Who.  It consists of four one-part stories by different authors, rather than the usual multi-part serial, all involving the number 100 in some way.  All episodes feature the Sixth Doctor as played by Colin Baker and Evelyn Smythe played by Maggie Stables.

Main cast
The Doctor — Colin Baker
Evelyn Smythe — Maggie Stables

100 BC
By Jacqueline Rayner

 This story is set in Rome in 100 BC and involves the parents of Julius Caesar.
Gaius Julius Caesar — Will Thorp
Aurelia — Lucy Paterson
Midwife — Susan Brown

My Own Private Wolfgang
By Robert Shearman

 This story involves an abnormally prolonged life of Mozart.
Mozart/Butler/Guest — John Sessions

Bedtime Story
By Joseph Lidster

 This story involves an unusual curse befalling an even more unusual family.
Jacob — Will Thorp
Old Jacob— Frank Finlay
Talia — Martha Cope
Mary — Susan Brown
Julia — Lucy Paterson
Patrick — Alex Mallinson

The 100 Days of the Doctor
By Paul Cornell

 This story concerns the Doctor preventing an assassination attempt on himself.
Assassin — Nicholas Briggs

Continuity
In the final story, The Doctor visits various aspects in Big Finish's Doctor Who range.  These include the Fifth Doctor with Peri and Erimem, the Seventh Doctor with Ace and Hex, the Eighth Doctor with Charley, C'rizz and Lucie, the Bernice Summerfield adventures, and the Unbound stories.  The Doctor says he has already met his next incarnation, possibly a reference to The Sirens of Time.

Cast notes
Will Thorp also appeared in the 2006 television episodes The Impossible Planet and The Satan Pit as Toby Zed.

Story notes
The Sixth Doctor and Evelyn break the fourth wall in episode 4, "100 Days of the Doctor"

External links
Big Finish Productions – 100

2007 audio plays
Sixth Doctor audio plays
Audio plays by Robert Shearman
Cultural depictions of Julius Caesar
Cultural depictions of Wolfgang Amadeus Mozart